The Lonia (or Lunia) or Nonia are Hindu other backward caste, found in Uttar Pradesh and adjoining areas, who were traditionally involved in salt-digging and salt-making activities. The Lonia or Nonia are listed as extremely backward caste  along with Mallah, Bind and Beldar communities, by state governments. The community leaders have been seeking Scheduled Tribe status for the socially deprived community.

Origins and status
Their population is concentrated in the eastern part of Uttar Pradesh such as Ghazipur, Azamgarh, Mau districts and some neighbouring areas. Lonia  or Nonia like other communities, had been victim of colonial oppression, which resulted in rebellion and they contributed to the fight for independence. 
In recent times, they have started writing Chauhan as their surname and calling themselves Rajput, which has no historical basis or evidence, as scholars have given examples of entire communities of Shudra origin "becoming" Rajput, termed as Rajputisation, even as late as the 20th century, under British Raj, for instance, William Rowe, in his "The new Chauhans : A caste mobility movement in North India", discusses an example of a large section of a Shudra caste - the Noniyas or Lonias- from Madhya Pradesh, Uttar Pradesh and Bihar that had tried to "become" Rajputs over three generations in the Raj era to seek upper mobility in the social hierarchy by emulating their customs and traditions.

Present circumstances
The Lonia or Nonia are one of the most socially, educationally and economically deprived communities, though recognised as OBCs by state governments, they have been seeking Scheduled Tribe status, for their upliftment.

References

Search for more details Branches of chauhan rajput

Social groups of Uttar Pradesh
Hindu communities
Saltmaking castes
Dalit communities